Pa Tappeh-ye Gunesban (also Romanized as Pā Tappeh-ye Gūnespān; also known as Pā Tappeh and Pā Tappeh Kūnsbān) is a village in Kamazan-e Sofla Rural District, Zand District, Malayer County, Hamadan Province, Iran. At the 2006 census, its population was 114, in 37 families.

References 

Populated places in Malayer County